Chaveyriat is a commune in the Ain department in eastern France. It sits north of the D396 road, and is located 7 km north east of Neuville-les-Dames and 13 km west of Bourg-en-Bresse.

The romanesque parish church is dedicated to St John the Baptist.

History
The first mention of the town dates from 933 under the name of Cavariaco in the collection of Charters of Cluny.

The castle of Chaveyriat was destroyed in 1376 by the troops of the Sire de Beaujeu, it had been the home of Hugues de Marchant, then, successively, was held by the families of Columbus, Cheminant, Varax, de la Cley.

In 1601, after the Treaty of Lyons, Chaveyriat became part of the Burgundy province of France.

Between 1790 and 1795, it became a municipality in the canton of Châtillon-les-Dombes.

Population

See also
Communes of the Ain department

References

External links

Gazetteer Entry

Communes of Ain
Ain communes articles needing translation from French Wikipedia